Kim Sang-woo (born February 2, 1992), also known by the stage name Woody, is a South Korean singer and songwriter. He debuted in 2011 as a member of the boyband N-Train.

Personal life 
Kim's older brother is professional baseball player Kim Sang-su, shortstop for the Samsung Lions.

Discography

Singles

References 

21st-century South Korean male  singers
1992 births
Living people
N-Train members
South Korean male singer-songwriters

South_Korean_male_idols